Extreme tourism (also often referred to as shock tourism, although both concepts do not appear strictly similar) is a niche in the tourism industry involving travel to dangerous places (mountains, jungles, deserts, caves, canyons, etc.) or participation in dangerous events. Extreme tourism overlaps with extreme sport. The two share the main attraction, "adrenaline rush" caused by an element of risk, and differing mostly in the degree of engagement and professionalism.

Some of the extreme famous attractions in the world:
Chernobyl Tours – Ukraine.
Swimming in the Devil's Pool in Victoria Falls – Zambia and Zimbabwe.
Walking the Plank at Mount Hua – China.
Death Road Tour – Bolivia.
Green Zone – Baghdad, Iraq.
Sac Actun tours – Riviera Maya, Mexico
Cave of Swallows – Mexico
Pole of Cold – Oymyakon, Yakutia, Siberia

See also
Caving, Speleology
Exploration
Paragliding, Bungee jumping, Skydiving, Base jumping
Storm chasing
Urban exploration
Via ferrata
War tourism

References

External links
Ladyvoyage.com: Extreme Tourism: Would you dare?
elementmoscow.ru: Extreme Tourism
BBC News: Russian tourists salute army boot camp
Wall Street Journal: "Adventure Vacations for Overachievers"
Cold Conquerors - Extreme challenge tour as part of an annual international scientific field expedition

Types of tourism
Adventure travel